Rudolf Sparing (1904–1955) was a German journalist. He was one of the founders of the newspaper Das Reich, serving as its editor between February 1943 and April 1945. Captured by the Red Army, he died in 1955 in a camp in Potma.

20th-century German journalists
German male journalists
1904 births
1955 deaths
20th-century German male writers
German prisoners of war in World War II held by the Soviet Union
German people who died in Soviet detention
German military personnel of World War II

Nazi propagandists
Nazis who died in prison custody